Swetha Naagu is a 2004 Indian devotional horror starring Soundarya, Abbas, and Sarath Babu. The film was originally planned to be made simultaneously in Telugu and Tamil; however the film was later shot simultaneously in Kannada as ( Shwetha Naagara) with a slightly different supporting cast for both the language versions. Many resources state that this was Soundarya's 100th milestone film and also her last proper film while still alive; she died two months later in that horrible helicopter crash and the latter had further two posthumous releases in the later part of the year. A white snake from Meghalaya was used in the film. Abbas who garnered acclaim with his debut in the Tamil film, Kadhal Desam was signed to play one of the leads in the film. The film began production in mid-2003. The movie was partially reshot and dubbed in Tamil as Madhumathi.

Cast 
Soundarya as Madhumathi
Abbas as Praveen, Madhumathi's love interest
 Sarath Babu as Shankar Reddy, Madhumathi's professor 
 Jaya Prakash Reddy as Sarpararanya Dhora (Telugu) / Sarpa Kaadu Dhorey (Kannada)	
 Abhinayashree as Naagini, a tribal girl
 Anand as Naagini's husband
 Babloo Prithviraj as a shapeshifting snake dancer (Cameo appearance)

Telugu and Tamil versions 
 Dharmavarapu Subramanyam as Ashok Kumar, Madhumathi's father
 Mallikarjuna Rao as Madhumathi's guardian
Kallu Chidambaram as a tribal man
 Sangeeta as Madhumathi's mother
 Brahmanandam as a chief guest
Karunas as "Black" Baba, a bus conductor (Tamil version)
 Pattabhi Ram as a tribal man
 Raghunatha Reddy as Praveen's father

Kannada version 
Dwarakish as Ashok Kumar, Madhumathi's father
 Kunigal Nagabhushan as Madhumathi's guardian
Sanketh Kashi as a chief guest
Bank Janardhan as Praveen's father
 Karibasavaiah as a bus conductor
 Shridevi as Madhumathi's mother
 Meena as Praveen's mother

Release 
Idlebrain gave the film a rating of 2.75 out of 5 and wrote that " Swetha Nagu is an average devotional film. And the USP (Unique Selling Point) is Soundarya". A critic from Sify noted that "The first half of the film is interesting, but the film peters out in the second half. However the plus point of the film is Soundarya".

References

External links 

2004 films
2000s Telugu-language films
2000s Kannada-language films
Indian multilingual films
Films about snakes
Indian films about revenge
Indian horror films
2004 horror films
2004 multilingual films